Ellen Streidt ( Stropahl later Wendland, born 27 July 1952 in Wittstock, Bezirk Potsdam) is a retired East German sprinter who specialised in the 200 metres and 400 metres.

At the 1972 Summer Olympics in Munich, she finished fourth in the 200m final, just one one-hundredth of a second behind bronze medallist Irena Szwesinska. At the 1976 Summer Olympics in Montreal, she won the bronze medal in the 400 metres and a gold medal in the 4 × 400 metres with her teammates Brigitte Rohde, Christina Brehmer and Doris Maletzki.

Achievements

References

1952 births
Living people
People from Ostprignitz-Ruppin
People from Bezirk Potsdam
East German female sprinters
Sportspeople from Brandenburg
Olympic athletes of East Germany
Athletes (track and field) at the 1972 Summer Olympics
Athletes (track and field) at the 1976 Summer Olympics
Olympic gold medalists for East Germany
Olympic bronze medalists for East Germany
European Athletics Championships medalists
Medalists at the 1976 Summer Olympics
Olympic gold medalists in athletics (track and field)
Olympic bronze medalists in athletics (track and field)
Universiade medalists in athletics (track and field)
Recipients of the Patriotic Order of Merit in silver
Universiade bronze medalists for East Germany
Medalists at the 1973 Summer Universiade
Olympic female sprinters